John Edward Wozniak (August 2, 1921 – August 26, 1982) was an American football offensive guard who played nine seasons in the All-America Football Conference, the National Football League and the Canadian Football League. He originally was drafted by the Pittsburgh Steelers in the 1948 NFL Draft and the Brooklyn Dodgers in the 1948 AAFC Draft.

External links
NFL.com player page

1921 births
1982 deaths
Players of American football from Pennsylvania
American football offensive guards
Alabama Crimson Tide football players
University of Alabama alumni
Brooklyn Dodgers (AAFC) players
New York Yankees (AAFC) players
New York Yanks players
Dallas Texans (NFL) players
Western Conference Pro Bowl players
Saskatchewan Roughriders players
People from Fayette County, Pennsylvania